To carry out the planned V-1 "flying bomb" attacks on the United Kingdom, Germany built a number of military installations including launching sites and depots. Some of the installations were huge concrete fortifications.

The Allies became aware of the sites at an early stage and carried out numerous bombing raids to destroy them before they came into use.

Production
The unpiloted aircraft was assembled at the KdF-Stadt Volkswagenwerke (described as "the largest pressed-steel works in Germany") near Fallersleben, at Cham/Bruns Werke, and at the Mittelwerk, underground factory in central Germany. Production plants to modify several hundred standard V-1s to Reichenberg R-III manned aircraft were in the woods of Dannenburg and at Pulverhof, with air-launch trials at Lärz and Rechlin. Flight testing was performed by the Luftwaffe at Peenemünde West and, after the August 1943 Operation Hydra bombing, at Brüsterort. Launch crew training was at Zempin, and the headquarters for the operational unit, Flak-Regiment 155(W), was originally based at Saleux, near Amiens, but was subsequently moved  to a chateau near Creil ("FlakGruppeCreil"), with the unit's telephone relay station at Doullens.

Other V-1 production-related sites included a Barth plant which used forced labor, Buchenwald (V-1 parts), and Allrich in the Harz.

In addition to the storage and launching sites listed below, operational facilities included the airfields for Heinkel He 111 H-22 bombers which air-launched the V-1 from low altitude over the North Sea. The ten-day-long aircrew training was at Peenemünde, and the bases were in Gilze-Rijen, Holland, for launches through 15 September 1944, and in Venlo for launches after the first week in December. Aircrews were billeted five miles away at Grossenkneten for secrecy.

Storage depots

To supply the V-1 flying bomb launch sites in the Calais region, construction began on several storage depots in August 1943. Sites at Biennais, Oisemont Neuville-au-Bois, and Saint-Martin-l'Hortier were not completed. An RCAF Halifax pilot's logbook describes the target of his raids on "flying-bomb sites" on July 1, 4, and 5, 1944, as "Biennais #1", "Biennais #2," and "Biennais #3". This suggests that these storage sites were perhaps not completed because they were destroyed prior to completion.

The completed sites were:

Domléger near Abbeville – bombed on June 14 and 16, and on July 4, 1944.
Renescure near Saint-Omer – finished in November 1943, it was bombed by the USAAF on June 16, 1944, by 48 B-24s and on July 2 by 21.
Sautricourt near Saint-Pol (bombed June 16, 1944).

To serve the ten launch sites planned for Normandy, a depot was constructed at Beauvais. It was bombed June 14, 15 and 16, 1944.

A depot to serve Cherbourg launches was built near Valognes. By February/March 1944, a plan for three new underground V-1 storage sites was put into effect. The Nucourt limestone cave complex between Pontoise and Gisors was bombed on June 22, 1944  with 298 V-1s buried or severely damaged.One in the Rilly-la-Montagne railway tunnel was attacked by the British with Tallboy earthquake bombs on July 31, collapsing both ends of the tunnel. The Saint-Leu-d'Esserent mushroom caves was the largest of the underground V-1 sites. It was attacked by No. 617 Squadron RAF with Tallboys on July 4.

A larger "Heavy Crossbow" bunker was built at Siracourt, between Calais and the river Somme, as a V-1 storage depot.

RAF records refer to flying-bomb stores at Bois de Cassan (bombed August 2–4, 1944), Forêt de Nieppe (bombed July 28, 29, 31, August 3,4, 5, 6, 1944 and Trossy St. Maximin (bombed August 3–4, 1944)

V-1 launch sequence

Final Assembly: After moving the V-1 from the storage area, the wings were slid/bolted over/to the tubular spar.
Final Checkout: In the non-magnetic building, "compass swinging" was completed by hanging the V-1 and pointing it toward the target. The missile's external casing of 16-gauge sheet steel was beaten with a mallet until its magnetic field was suitably aligned. The automatic pilot was set with the flight altitude input (300–2500 metres) to the barometric (aneroid) height control and with the range set within the air log (journey computer).
Hoisting: The V-1 was delivered to the launching ramp via a wooden handling trolley on rails. A wooden lifting gantry on rails was connected to the V-1 lifting lug to hoist and move it onto the launching spot at the lower end of the launching ramp.
Fueling and Charging: Via the tank filler cap, 1,133 lbs (140 gallons) of petrol were added (later longer-range models held more). The twin spherical iron air bottles were charged with 900 psi air to power the automatic pilot (Steuergerät). Air at 90 psi powered the pneumatic servo-motors for the elevators and rudder.
Catapult setup: The starter trolley with the hydrogen peroxide and catalyst (potassium permanganate granules, Z-stoff) was connected to provide steam to the ramp's firing tube, and the steam piston was placed into the firing tube with the piston's launching lug connected to the V-1.
V-1 startup: While the steam-generating trolley was being connected, the Argus As 109-014 Ofenrohr pulsejet engine was started.
Launch
Post-launch: The steam piston, having separated from the V-1 at the end of the ramp during launch, was collected for re-use (the site nominally had only two pistons). Personnel in rubber boots and protective clothing used a catwalk along the ramp and washed the launching rail with brooms.

V-1 launching sites
V-1 launching sites in France were located in nine general areas – four of which had the ramps aligned toward London, and the remainder toward Brighton, Dover, Newhaven, Hastings, Southampton, Manchester, Portsmouth, Bristol, and Plymouth. The sites on the Cherbourg peninsula targeting Bristol and Plymouth were captured before being used, and eventually launching ramps were moved to Holland to target Antwerp (first launched on 3 March 1945 from Delft).

Initially the V-1 launching sites had storage buildings that were curved at the end to protect the contents against damage from air attacks. On aerial reconnaissance pictures these storage from above looked like snow skis ("ski sites"). An October 28, 1943 intelligence report regarding construction at Bois Carré near Yvrench prompted No. 170 Squadron RAF reconnaissance sortie E/463 on November 3 which detected "ski-shaped buildings 240-270 feet long." By November 1943, 72 of the ski sites had been located by Allied reconnaissance, and Operation Crossbow began bombing the original ski sites on December 5, 1943. Nazi Germany subsequently began constructing modified sites with limited structures that could be completed quickly, as necessary. This also allowed the modified sites to be quickly repaired after bombing. The work to complete a modified site before launching allowed the Allied photographic interpreters to predict on June 11, 1944, that the V-1 attacks would begin within 48 hours, and the first attacks began on June 13.

Allied attacks

Notes

References
Citations

Bibliography

1943: August December
1944: January, February, March, April, May, June, July, August, September, October, November, December
1945: January, February, March

1943: January, February, March, April, May, June, July, August, September, October, November, December
1944: January, February, March,April, May, June, July, August, September, October, November, December
1945: January, February, March,April, May, June, July, August, September

External links

 
Rocket launch sites
Ruins in Normandy
World War II sites in France
World War II sites of Nazi Germany
German military-related lists
Nazi-related lists
World War II-related lists